Lugdunin is an investigational antibiotic, classified as a thiazolidine-containing cyclic peptide. It was isolated in 2016 after Staphylococcus lugdunensis was identified as the species of bacteria from the human nose that suppressed growth of species of disease-causing bacteria in that part of the human microbiome.

Lugdunin is a non-ribosomally synthesized cyclic peptide that inhibits growth of Staphylococcus aureus strains. The lugdunin genes are located on a 30-kbp operon. The genes lugA, lugB, lugC, and lugD encode four non-ribosomal peptide synthases, which are preceded by a putative regulator gene lugR.

Biosynthesis 
Lugdunin is synthesized by non ribosomal peptide synthetases in S. lugdunensis. The molecule is a cyclic peptide composed of a thiazolidine heterocycle and three D amino acids. The operon responsible for lugdunin synthesis is approximately 30 kb and contains four non ribosomal peptide synthetase genes. The operon contains a phosphopantetheinyl transferase, monooxygenase, an unknown tailoring enzyme, a regulator gene, and a type II thioesterase. Phosphopantetheinyl transferases carry out the activation of T domains, which act as carrier proteins. Monooxygenases incorporate a single hydroxyl into a lugdunin intermediate. The type II thioesterase is utilized to remove intermediates that stall during biosynthesis.

A surprising note about lugdunin is that the operon only encodes five adenylation domains, an interestingly small amount for such a large molecule. This discrepancy is accounted for by the addition of three consecutive valine residues in alternating D and L configurations by LugC. The thiazolidine ring forms following the release of the metabolite via reduction. The N-terminal L-Cysteine residue nucleophilically attacks the carbonyl on the C-terminal L-valine residue, thus forming an imine macrocycle. The Schiff base formed in this reaction is then nucleophilically attacked by a cysteine thiol which produces the thiazolidine heterocycle previously described.

References

External links
 

Antimicrobial peptides
Cyclic peptides